Solenostomus, also known as the ghost pipefishes, false pipefishes or tubemouth fishes, is a genus of fishes in the order Syngnathiformes. Solenostomus is the only genus in the family Solenostomidae, and includes six currently recognized species. Ghost pipefishes are related to  pipefishes and seahorses. They are found in tropical waters of the Indo-Pacific.

They feed on tiny crustaceans, sucked inside through their long snout. They live in open waters except during breeding, when they find a coral reef or muddy bottom, changing color and shape to minimize visibility.

In many respects, they are similar to the pipefishes, but can be distinguished by the presence of pelvic fins, a prominent, spiny, dorsal fin, and star-shaped plates on the skin. Unlike true pipefish, female ghostpipefishes use their enlarged pelvic fins to brood their eggs until they hatch.

Species
 Solenostomus armatus M. C. W. Weber, 1913 (long-tailed ghost pipefish or armored pipefish)
 Solenostomus cyanopterus Bleeker, 1854 (robust ghost pipefish)
 Solenostomus halimeda J. W. Orr, Fritzsche & J. E. Randall, 2002 (Halimeda ghost pipefish)
 Solenostomus leptosoma S. Tanaka (I), 1908 (delicate ghost pipefish)
 Solenostomus paegnius Jordan & Thompson, 1914 (roughsnout ghost pipefish)
 Solenostomus paradoxus (Pallas, 1770) (ornate ghost pipefish or harlequin ghost pipefish)

References

 
 Tim Flannery and Peter Schouten. Amazing Animals: Extraordinary Creatures and the Fantastic Worlds They Inhabit. New York: Atlantic Monthly Press, 2004. Page 116-117.
Orr, JW and Fritzsche, RA. 1993. Revision of the Ghost Pipefishes, Family Solenostomidae (Teleostei: Syngnathoidei). Copeia 1993:168-182.

External links  
Photos of the 5 different species of Ghostpipefishes
55 photos of  different Ghostpipefishes species
Video of different species of Ghostpipefishes

 
Marine fish genera
 

Extant Eocene first appearances
Taxa named by Bernard Germain de Lacépède